The 3rd Politburo of the Lao People's Revolutionary Party (LPRP), officially the Political Bureau of the 3rd Central Committee of the Lao People's Revolutionary Party, was elected in 1982 by the 1st Plenary Session of the 3rd Central Committee, in the immediate aftermath of the 3rd National Congress.

Members

References

Specific

Bibliography
Books:
 

Articles and journals:
 

3rd Politburo of the Lao People's Revolutionary Party
1982 establishments in Laos
1986 disestablishments in Laos